Simonetta Agnello Hornby is an Italian novelist and food writer. Her novels are international bestsellers, translated in more than twenty languages.

Biography
Born in Palermo, Sicily, in 1945, Simonetta Agnello Hornby has spent most of her adult life in England where she worked as a solicitor for a community legal aid firm specialized in domestic violence that she co-founded in 1979. She has been lecturing for many years, and was a part-time judge at the Special Educational Needs and Disability Tribunal for eight years.

Her debut novel La Mennulara (The Almond Picker) was published in Italy in 2002 by Feltrinelli, and was awarded the Forte Village Literary Prize, The Stresa Prize for Fiction, and the "Alassio 100 Libri - An Author for Europe" Prize in 2003. Translated into more than ten languages, it became an international bestseller.

In the following decade, Simonetta Agnello Hornby wrote six more novels: La zia Marchesa (The Marchesa), Boccamurata, Vento Scomposto, La Monaca (The Nun, winner of the Italian Pen Prize), and Il veleno dell'Oleandro. She has also published memoirs (Via XX settembre, La mia Londra), a collection of short stories (Il male che si deve raccontare), books of recipes and etiquette Un filo d'olio, La cucina del buon gusto). Her last book, Il pranzo di Mosè, was published in Italy in 2014. 
She lives in London.

She was awarded the Order of the Star of Italy in the rank of Grand Officer by the President of Italy on 2 June 2016.

She married Martin Hornby. They have two sons, George and Nicholas.

Works translated into English
Novels:

References

1945 births
Living people
Writers from Palermo
21st-century Italian novelists
Italian women novelists
21st-century Italian women writers
Italian emigrants to the United Kingdom